Palača) is a small village in Osijek-Baranja County, Croatia. It is part of the Šodolovci municipality and it has a population of 241 (census 2011). The settlement was originally established as a pustara, a Pannonian type of hamlet.

See also
Šodolovci Municipality

References

Populated places in Osijek-Baranja County
Joint Council of Municipalities
Serb communities in Croatia